Cottun is a commune in the Calvados department in the Normandy region in northwestern France.

Population

See also
Communes of the Calvados department

References

Communes of Calvados (department)
Calvados communes articles needing translation from French Wikipedia